F.C. Pardes Hanna-Karkur, Moadon Sport Pardes Hanna-Karkur, lit. Pardes Hanna-Karkur Sport Club (or in short , Mem Samekh Pardes Hanna-Karkur, lit. F.C. Pardes Hanna-Karkur) is an Israeli football club based in Pardes Hanna-Karkur. The club currently plays in Liga Bet North B division.

The club is named after Israel Police Assistant Commissioner, Lior Boker, who perished in the Mount Carmel forest fire.

History
The club was founded in 1995 and operated only a youth section, until 2010, when the senior side was created and joined Liga Gimel Samaria division.

The club finished runners-up in their debut season, a feat which they repeated in the 2011–12 and 2013–14 seasons, respectively. However, prior to the 2014–15 season, and after several vacancies were created in Liga Bet, the club achieved promotion to Liga Bet and was placed in the North B division, following the dissolution of Hapoel Yokneam, which merged with Liga Alef club, Maccabi Daliyat al-Karmel.

External links
Official website 
Sport Club Pardes Hanna-Karkur Lior Boker Israel Football Association

References

Pardes Hanna-Karkur
Pardes Hanna-Karkur
Association football clubs established in 2010
2010 establishments in Israel